The 1968 South African presidential election resulted in the unanimous election of Jacobus Johannes Fouché of the National Party by the South African Parliament. Fouché was elected to the ceremonial post of State President of South Africa on February 19, 1968, and was sworn in on April 10, 1968. He was the only South African State President to serve a full seven-year term, which ended on 9 April 1975.

Bibliography 

Presidential elections in South Africa
1968 elections in South Africa